Limnaecia effulgens is a moth in the family Cosmopterigidae. It is found in South Africa.

References

Natural History Museum Lepidoptera generic names catalog

Endemic moths of South Africa
Limnaecia
Moths described in 1918
Taxa named by Edward Meyrick
Moths of Africa